The IBSA World Games (formerly IBSA World Championships and Games) or World Blind Games are an international multi-sport event, occurring every four years, organized by the International Blind Sports Federation (IBSA). The events enable blind and partially sighted athletes to compete in a number of sports. The first event took place at Madrid, Spain in 1998.

The competitions in athletics, swimming, goalball and judo are part of the qualification process for the Paralympic Games.

Events

IBSA World Games

IBSA World Youth Games  (WYC)
 Former name: IBSA World Youth and Student Games

 2013 also IBSA Para Pan-American Games.
 2009 and 2011 in judo and goalball and Athletics and 2013 in judo and goalball, 2015 and 2017 only in goalball.
 https://web.archive.org/web/20120702142551/http://www.ibsa.es/eng/competiciones/historicoFechas.asp
 http://www.ibsa.es/eng/competiciones/historico.asp?id=6&anio=2005  - 2005 and 2007 Sports : Athletics, Goalball, Judo, Powerlifting, Swimming
 https://konanjudo.org/2010/11/26/2011-ibsa-world-youth-and-student-championships/
 http://www.ibsasport.org/news/307/2013-ibsa-para-pan-american-games-and-world-youth-and-student-games-results 
 http://www.ibsasport.org/calendar/615/2015-ibsa-world-youth-games-goalball-championships 
 https://web.archive.org/web/20170902074459/http://usaba.org/index.php/sports/past-events/

1998 IBSA World Games

The inaugural 1998 sports event was held in Madrid, Spain for athletics, swimming, goalball and judo for the blind and vision-impaired.

2003 IBSA World Games

The 2003 Quebec, Canada event included five-a-side football, goalball and judo, other disciplines have been added to the event.  Blind athletes were able to compete in the following sports: powerlifting, ten-pin and nine-pin bowling, biathlon, alpine skiing, archery, showdown, swimming, shooting, torball, Nordic skiing, athletics and cycling.  Although a lot of winter sports were added to the list such as skiing, but also bowling and many others, but was held in five sports: Swimming, athletics, goalball, judo, and powerlifting.

2007 IBSA World Games

The 2007 São Paulo, Brazil sports were powerlifting, judo, goalball, football, swimming, and athletics.

 http://www.ibsasport.org/photos/pictures/345.jpg

2011 IBSA World Games

The 2011 Antalya, Turkey sports were athletics, chess, futsal (football) B1, futsal (football) B2/B3, goalball, judo, powerlifting, swimming.

2015 IBSA World Games

The 2015 IBSA World Championships and Games was held from 8 to 18 June 2015, in Seoul, South Korea and included competitions in ten sports:
 athletics, at the Incheon Munhak Stadium
 chess, at the Olympic Parktel Hotel
 futsal B1, at the Songpa women's football field
 Futsal B2/B3, at the SK Olympic Handball Gymnasium 
 goalball, in the Jangchung Arena for the men's competition, and SK Handball Centre for the women's competition 
 judo, at the Jamsil student gymnasium 
 powerlifting, at the Woori Financial Art Hall
 showdown
 swimming, at the Tancheon swimming pool
 tandem cycling
 tenpin bowling, at the Tancheon bowling centre.

Venues were scattered around the city, including opening and closing ceremonies at the Jamsil Arena.  About 1626 athletes competed from fifty-seven countries.  The event motto was 'See with Passion, Run with Hope'.  Mascots were Dari, Haechi and Suri.

2019 IBSA World Games

Nominations for the host nation for the 2019 IBSA World Games was called on 3 March 2017.  It was not possible to find a host nation able to cater for all the sports.  Instead the IBSA Goalball and Judo Paralympic Games qualifying tournaments were held in Fort Wayne, Indiana, United States of America in June–July 2019, in conjunction with the federation's four-yearly international general assembly.

2023 IBSA World Games

IBSA indicated it would commence searching for a host nation in the latter part of 2018. On 11 May 2020, the University of Birmingham, England was announced as the host city, for 18–27 August 2023, with the sports of judo, goalball, football, chess, tenpin bowling, shooting, and showdown.

External links
http://iis.ibsawg2015seoul.org/en-us/Medal/medal_class.jsp
http://www.ibsasport.org/paginas/?url=seoul-2015-ibsa-world-games
 http://www.ibsa.es/esp/galeria/13/campeonato/campe_i.htm 
 https://www.ibsaworldgames2011.com/the-ibsa-competitions.html - Sports
 https://www.ibsaworldgames2011.com/the-ibsa-organizing-members.html

References

IBSA competitions
Recurring sporting events established in 1998
Multi-sport events
Parasports competitions